Utaka is the term used for open water-dwelling cichlids found in Lake Malawi, the most diverse source of cichlids in the world of aquaria.  Among others, they comprise all the members of the genera Copadichromis and Mchenga.  

They are the opposite niche from the mbuna, the more common type of Malawi cichlid that dwells among rocks along the lake's fringes and bottom.

Unlike mbuna, which are generally colorful from birth, utaka tend to be very neutral in color -- mostly greys -- until they reach adulthood, because their free-swimming nature leaves them more vulnerable to predation. They are highly sexually dimorphic; the females of the genre tend to remain bland in coloration, while the males often become spectacularly colorful, leading to common names like "peacock cichlid."

References

See also 
List of freshwater aquarium fish species

Cichlid fish of Africa
Fish of Lake Malawi
Fish common names